The Parliament of the United Kingdom is the supreme legislative body of the United Kingdom, the Crown Dependencies and the British Overseas Territories. It meets at the Palace of Westminster, London. It alone possesses legislative supremacy and thereby ultimate power over all other political bodies in the UK and the overseas territories. Parliament is bicameral but has three parts, consisting of the sovereign (King-in-Parliament), the House of Lords, and the House of Commons (the primary chamber). In theory, power is officially vested in the King-in-Parliament. However, the Crown normally acts on the advice of the prime minister, and the powers of the House of Lords are limited to only delaying legislation; thus power is de facto vested in the House of Commons.

The House of Commons is an elected chamber with elections to 650 single-member constituencies held at least every five years under the first-past-the-post system. By constitutional convention, all government ministers, including prime minister, are members of the House of Commons or, less commonly, the House of Lords and are thereby accountable to the respective branches of the legislature. Most cabinet ministers are from the Commons, whilst junior ministers can be from either house.

The House of Lords is the second chamber of Parliament. The House of Lords includes two different types of members. The most numerous are the Lords Temporal, consisting mainly of life peers appointed by the sovereign on the advice of the prime minister, and of 92 hereditary peers. The less numerous Lords Spiritual consist of the most senior bishops of the Church of England. Prior to the opening of the Supreme Court in October 2009, the House of Lords also performed a judicial role through the Law Lords.

The UK Parliament has shaped the political systems of the nations once ruled by the British Empire, and thus has been called the "Mother of Parliaments".

History

The Parliament of Great Britain was formed in 1707 following the ratification of the Treaty of Union by Acts of Union passed by the Parliament of England (established 1215) and the Parliament of Scotland (c.1235), both Acts of Union stating, "That the United Kingdom of Great Britain be represented by one and the same Parliament to be styled The Parliament of Great Britain." At the start of the 19th century, Parliament was further enlarged by Acts of Union ratified by the Parliament of Great Britain and the Parliament of Ireland that abolished the latter and added 100 Irish MPs and 32 Lords to the former to create the Parliament of the United Kingdom of Great Britain and Ireland. The Royal and Parliamentary Titles Act 1927 formally amended the name to the "Parliament of the United Kingdom of Great Britain and Northern Ireland", five years after the secession of the Irish Free State.

Parliament of the United Kingdom of Great Britain and Ireland

The United Kingdom of Great Britain and Ireland was created on 1 January 1801, by the merger of the Kingdoms of Great Britain and Ireland under the Acts of Union 1800. The principle of ministerial responsibility to the lower house (Commons) did not develop until the 19th century—the House of Lords was superior to the House of Commons both in theory and in practice. Members of the House of Commons (MPs) were elected in an antiquated electoral system, under which constituencies of vastly different sizes existed. Thus, the borough of Old Sarum, with seven voters, could elect two members, as could the borough of Dunwich, which had almost completely disappeared into the sea due to land erosion.

Many small constituencies, known as pocket or rotten boroughs, were controlled by members of the House of Lords, who could ensure the election of their relatives or supporters. During the reforms of the 19th century, beginning with the Reform Act 1832, the electoral system for the House of Commons was progressively regularised. No longer dependent on the Lords for their seats, MPs grew more assertive.

The supremacy of the British House of Commons was reaffirmed in the early 20th century. In 1909, the Commons passed the so-called "People's Budget," which made numerous changes to the taxation system which were detrimental to wealthy landowners. The House of Lords, which consisted mostly of powerful landowners, rejected the Budget. On the basis of the Budget's popularity and the Lords' consequent unpopularity, the Liberal Party narrowly won two general elections in 1910.

Using the result as a mandate, the Liberal Prime Minister, H. H. Asquith, introduced the Parliament Bill, which sought to restrict the powers of the House of Lords. (He did not reintroduce the land tax provision of the People's Budget.) When the Lords refused to pass the bill, Asquith countered with a promise extracted from the King in secret before the second general election of 1910 and requested the creation of several hundred Liberal peers, so as to erase the Conservative majority in the House of Lords. In the face of such a threat, the House of Lords narrowly passed the bill.

The Parliament Act 1911, as it became, prevented the Lords from blocking a money bill (a bill dealing with taxation), and allowed them to delay any other bill for a maximum of three sessions (reduced to two sessions in 1949), after which it could become law over their objections. However, regardless of the Parliament Acts of 1911 and 1949, the House of Lords has always retained the unrestricted power to veto any bill outright which attempts to extend the life of a parliament.

Parliament of the United Kingdom of Great Britain and Northern Ireland
The result of the 1918 general election in Ireland showed a landslide victory for the Irish republican party Sinn Féin, who vowed in their manifesto to establish an independent Irish Republic. Accordingly, Sinn Féin MPs, though ostensibly elected to sit in the House of Commons, refused to take their seats in Westminster, and instead assembled in 1919 to proclaim Irish independence and form a revolutionary unicameral parliament for the independent Irish Republic, called Dáil Éireann.

In 1920, in parallel to the Dáil, the Government of Ireland Act 1920 created home rule parliaments of Northern Ireland and Southern Ireland and reduced the representation of both parts at Westminster. The number of Northern Ireland seats was increased again after the introduction of direct rule in 1973.

The Irish republicans responded by declaring the elections to these home rule Parliaments, held on the same day in 1921, to be the basis of membership for a new Dáil Éireann. While the elections in Northern Ireland were both contested and won by Unionist parties, in Southern Ireland, all 128 candidates for the Southern Irish seats were returned unopposed. Of these, 124 were won by Sinn Féin and four by independent Unionists representing Dublin University (Trinity College). Since only four MPs sat in the home rule Southern Irish parliament, with the remaining 124 being in the Republic's Second Dáil, the home rule parliament was adjourned sine die without ever having operated.

In 1922, pursuant to the Anglo-Irish Treaty, the revolutionary Irish Republic was replaced by the Irish Free State, recognised by Westminster as independent, while Northern Ireland would remain British, and in 1927 parliament was renamed the Parliament of the United Kingdom of Great Britain and Northern Ireland. 

Further reforms to the House of Lords were made in the 20th century. The Life Peerages Act 1958 authorised the regular creation of life peerage dignities. By the 1960s, the regular creation of hereditary peerage dignities had ceased; thereafter, almost all new peers were life peers only.

The House of Lords Act 1999 removed the automatic right of hereditary peers to sit in the House of Lords, although it made an exception for 92 of them to be elected to life-terms by the other hereditary peers, with by-elections upon their death. The House of Lords is now a chamber that is subordinate to the House of Commons. Additionally, the Constitutional Reform Act 2005 led to abolition of the judicial functions of the House of Lords with the creation of the new Supreme Court of the United Kingdom in October 2009.

Composition and powers
The legislative authority, the King-in-Parliament, has three separate elements: the Monarch, the House of Lords, and the House of Commons. No individual may be a member of both Houses, and members of the House of Lords are legally barred from voting in elections for members of the House of Commons. Formerly, no-one could be a Member of Parliament (MP) while holding an office of profit under the Crown, thus maintaining the separation of powers, but the principle has been gradually eroded. Until 1919, Members of Parliament who were appointed to ministerial office lost their seats in the House of Commons and had to seek re-election; the rule was abolished in 1926. Holders of offices are ineligible to serve as a Member of Parliament under the House of Commons Disqualification Act 1975.

Royal Assent of the Monarch is required for all Bills to become law, and certain delegated legislation must be made by the Monarch by Order in Council. The Crown also has executive powers which do not depend on Parliament, through prerogative powers, including the power to make treaties, declare war, award honours, and appoint officers and civil servants. In practice these are always exercised by the monarch on the advice of the Prime Minister and the other ministers of HM Government. The Prime Minister and government are directly accountable to Parliament, through its control of public finances, and to the public, through the election of members of parliament.

The Monarch also appoints the Prime Minister, who then forms a government from members of the Houses of Parliament. This must be someone who could command a majority in a confidence vote in the House of Commons. In the past the monarch has occasionally had to make a judgement, as in the appointment of Alec Douglas-Home in 1963 when it was thought that the incumbent Prime Minister, Harold Macmillan, had become ill with terminal cancer. However, today the outgoing Prime Minister advises the monarch who should be offered the position.

The House of Lords is known formally as "The Right Honourable The Lords Spiritual and Temporal in Parliament Assembled", the Lords Spiritual being bishops of the Church of England and the Lords Temporal being Peers of the Realm. The Lords Spiritual and Lords Temporal are considered separate "estates", but they sit, debate and vote together.

Since the Parliament Acts 1911 and 1949, the powers of the House of Lords have been very much less than those of the House of Commons. All bills except money bills are debated and voted upon in the House of Lords; however, by voting against a bill, the House of Lords can only delay it for a maximum of two parliamentary sessions over a year. After that time, the House of Commons can force the Bill through without the Lords' consent, under the Parliament Acts. The House of Lords can also hold the government to account through questions to government ministers and the operation of a small number of select committees. The highest court in England & Wales and in Northern Ireland used to be a committee of the House of Lords, but it became an independent supreme court in 2009.

The Lords Spiritual formerly included all of the senior clergymen of the Church of England—archbishops, bishops, abbots and mitred priors. Upon the Dissolution of the Monasteries under Henry VIII the abbots and mitred priors lost their positions in Parliament. All diocesan bishops continued to sit in Parliament, but the Bishopric of Manchester Act 1847, and later Acts, provide that only the 26 most senior are Lords Spiritual. These always include the incumbents of the "five great sees", namely the Archbishop of Canterbury, the Archbishop of York, the Bishop of London, the Bishop of Durham and the Bishop of Winchester. The remaining 21 Lords Spiritual are the most senior diocesan bishops, ranked in order of consecration, although the Lords Spiritual (Women) Act 2015 makes time-limited provision for vacancies to be filled by women who are bishops.

The Lords Temporal are life peers created under the Appellate Jurisdiction Act 1876 and the Life Peerages Act 1958, in addition to 92 hereditary peers under the House of Lords Act 1999. Formerly, the Lords Temporal were exclusively hereditary peers. The right of some hereditary peers to sit in Parliament was not automatic: after Scotland and England united into Great Britain in 1707, it was provided that all peers whose dignities had been created by English kings could sit in Parliament, but those whose dignities had been created by Scottish kings were to elect a limited number of "representative peers." A similar arrangement was made in respect of Ireland when it was united with Great Britain in 1801, but when southern Ireland left the United Kingdom in 1922 the election of Irish representative peers ceased. By the Peerage Act 1963, the election of Scottish representative peers also ended, and all Scottish peers were granted the right to sit in Parliament. Under the House of Lords Act 1999, only life peerages (that is to say, peerage dignities which cannot be inherited) automatically entitle their holders to seats in the House of Lords. Of the hereditary peers, only 92—the Earl Marshal, the Lord Great Chamberlain and the 90 elected by other peers—retain their seats in the House.

As of 2019, the House consists of 650 members, however one seat is left vacant by the Speaker of the House, who must remain politically impartial, and so does not get a vote on the passing of bills. Each Member of Parliament (MP) is chosen by a single constituency by the First-Past-the-Post electoral system. There are 650 constituencies in the United Kingdom, each made up of an average of 65,925 voters. The First-Past-the-Post system means that every constituency elects one MP each (except the constituency of the Speaker, whose seat is uncontested). Each voter assigns one vote for one candidate, and the candidate with the most votes in each constituency is elected as MP to represent their constituency. A party needs to win 326 constituencies (known as "seats") to win a majority in the House of Commons. If no party achieves a majority, then a situation of no overall control occurs – commonly known as a "Hung Parliament". In case of a Hung Parliament, the party with the most seats has the opportunity to form a coalition with other parties, so their combined seat tally extends past the 326-seat majority. Universal adult suffrage exists for those 18 and over; citizens of the United Kingdom, and those of the Republic of Ireland and Commonwealth nations resident in the United Kingdom, are qualified to vote, unless they are in prison at the time of the election. The term of members of the House of Commons depends on the term of Parliament, a maximum of five years; a general election, during which all the seats are contested, occurs after each dissolution (see below).

All legislation must be passed by the House of Commons to become law and it controls taxation and the supply of money to the government. Government ministers (including the Prime Minister) must regularly answer questions in the House of Commons and there are a number of select committees that scrutinise particular issues and the workings of the government. There are also mechanisms that allow members of the House of Commons to bring to the attention of the government particular issues affecting their constituents.

State Opening of Parliament

The State Opening of Parliament is an annual event that marks the commencement of a session of the Parliament of the United Kingdom. It is held in the House of Lords Chamber. Before 2012, it took place in November or December, or, in a general election year, when the new Parliament first assembled. From 2012 onwards, the ceremony has taken place in May or June.

Upon the signal of the Monarch, the Lord Great Chamberlain raises their wand of office to signal to Black Rod, who is charged with summoning the House of Commons and has been waiting in the Commons lobby. Black Rod turns and, under the escort of the Door-keeper of the House of Lords and an inspector of police, approaches the doors to the Chamber of the Commons. In 1642, King Charles I stormed into the House of Commons in an unsuccessful attempt to arrest the Five Members, who included the celebrated English patriot and leading Parliamentarian John Hampden. This action sparked the English Civil War. The wars established the constitutional rights of Parliament, a concept legally established in the Glorious Revolution in 1688 and the subsequent Bill of Rights 1689. Since then, no British monarch has entered the House of Commons when it is in session. On Black Rod's approach, the doors are slammed shut against them, symbolising the rights of parliament and its independence from the monarch. They then strike, with the end of their ceremonial staff (the Black Rod), three times on the closed doors of the Commons Chamber. They are then admitted, and announce the command of the monarch for the attendance of the Commons.

The monarch reads a speech, known as the Speech from the Throne, which is prepared by the Prime Minister and the Cabinet, outlining the Government's agenda for the coming year. The speech reflects the legislative agenda for which the Government intends to seek the agreement of both Houses of Parliament.

After the monarch leaves, each Chamber proceeds to the consideration of an "Address in Reply to His Majesty's Gracious Speech." But, first, each House considers a bill pro forma to symbolise their right to deliberate independently of the monarch. In the House of Lords, the bill is called the Select Vestries Bill, while the Commons equivalent is the Outlawries Bill. The Bills are considered for the sake of form only, and do not make any actual progress.

Legislative procedure

See also the stages of a bill section in Acts of Parliament in the United Kingdom
Both houses of the British Parliament are presided over by a speaker, the Speaker of the House for the Commons and the Lord Speaker in the House of Lords.

For the Commons, the approval of the Sovereign is theoretically required before the election of the Speaker becomes valid, but it is, by modern convention, always granted. The Speaker's place may be taken by the Chairman of Ways and Means, the First Deputy Chairman, or the Second Deputy Chairman. (The titles of those three officials refer to the Committee of Ways and Means, a body which no longer exists.)

Prior to July 2006, the House of Lords was presided over by a Lord Chancellor (a Cabinet member), whose influence as Speaker was very limited (whilst the powers belonging to the Speaker of the House of Commons are vast). However, as part of the Constitutional Reform Act 2005, the position of Speaker of the House of Lords (as it is termed in the Act) was separated from the office of Lord Chancellor (the office which has control over the judiciary as a whole), though the Lords remain largely self-governing. Decisions on points of order and on the disciplining of unruly members are made by the whole body, but by the Speaker alone in the Lower House. Speeches in the House of Lords are addressed to the House as a whole (using the words "My Lords"), but those in the House of Commons are addressed to the Speaker alone (using "Mr Speaker" or "Madam Speaker"). Speeches may be made to both Houses simultaneously.

Both Houses may decide questions by voice vote; members shout out "Aye!" and "No!" in the Commons—or "Content!" and "Not-Content!" in the Lords—and the presiding officer declares the result. The pronouncement of either Speaker may be challenged, and a recorded vote (known as a division) demanded. (The Speaker of the House of Commons may choose to overrule a frivolous request for a division, but the Lord Speaker does not have that power.) In each House, a division requires members to file into one of the two lobbies alongside the Chamber; their names are recorded by clerks, and their votes are counted as they exit the lobbies to re-enter the Chamber. The Speaker of the House of Commons is expected to be non-partisan, and does not cast a vote except in the case of a tie; the Lord Speaker, however, votes along with the other Lords.

Both Houses normally conduct their business in public, and there are galleries where visitors may sit.

Duration
Originally there was no fixed limit on the length of a Parliament, but the Triennial Act 1694 set the maximum duration at three years. As the frequent elections were deemed inconvenient, the Septennial Act 1715 extended the maximum to seven years, but the Parliament Act 1911 reduced it to five. During the Second World War, the term was temporarily extended to ten years by Acts of Parliament. Since the end of the war the maximum has remained five years. Modern Parliaments, however, rarely continued for the maximum duration; normally, they were dissolved earlier. For instance, the 52nd, which assembled in 1997, was dissolved after four years. The Septennial Act was repealed by the Fixed-term Parliaments Act 2011, which established a presumption that a Parliament will last for five years, unless two thirds of the House of Commons votes for an early general election, or the government loses the confidence of the House.

Summary history of terms of the Parliament of the United Kingdom

Following a general election, a new Parliamentary session begins. Parliament is formally summoned 40 days in advance by the Sovereign, who is the source of parliamentary authority. On the day indicated by the Sovereign's proclamation, the two Houses assemble in their respective chambers. The Commons are then summoned to the House of Lords, where Lords Commissioners (representatives of the Sovereign) instruct them to elect a Speaker. The Commons perform the election; on the next day, they return to the House of Lords, where the Lords Commissioners confirm the election and grant the new Speaker the royal approval in the Sovereign's name.

The business of Parliament for the next few days of its session involves the taking of the oaths of allegiance. Once a majority of the members have taken the oath in each House, the State Opening of Parliament may take place. The Lords take their seats in the House of Lords Chamber, the Commons appear at the Bar (at the entrance to the Chamber), and the Sovereign takes the seat on the throne. The Sovereign then reads the Speech from the Throne—the content of which is determined by the Ministers of the Crown—outlining the Government's legislative agenda for the upcoming year. Thereafter, each House proceeds to the transaction of legislative business.

By custom, before considering the Government's legislative agenda, a bill is introduced pro forma in each House—the Select Vestries Bill in the House of Lords and the Outlawries Bill in the House of Commons. These bills do not become laws; they are ceremonial indications of the power of each House to debate independently of the Crown. After the pro forma bill is introduced, each House debates the content of the Speech from the Throne for several days. Once each House formally sends its reply to the Speech, legislative business may commence, appointing committees, electing officers, passing resolutions and considering legislation.

A session of Parliament is brought to an end by a prorogation. There is a ceremony similar to the State Opening, but much less well known to the general public. Normally, the Sovereign does not personally attend the prorogation ceremony in the House of Lords and is represented by Lords Commissioners. The next session of Parliament begins under the procedures described above, but it is not necessary to conduct another election of a Speaker or take the oaths of allegiance afresh at the beginning of such subsequent sessions. Instead, the State Opening of Parliament proceeds directly. To avoid the delay of opening a new session in the event of an emergency during the long summer recess, Parliament is no longer prorogued beforehand, but only after the Houses have reconvened in the autumn; the State Opening follows a few days later.

Each Parliament comes to an end, after a number of sessions, in anticipation of a general election. Parliament is dissolved by virtue of the Dissolution and Calling of Parliament Act 2022 and previously the Fixed-term Parliaments Act 2011. Prior to that, dissolution was effected by the Sovereign, always on the advice of the Prime Minister. The Prime Minister could seek dissolution at a time politically advantageous to their party. If the Prime Minister loses the support of the House of Commons, Parliament will dissolve and a new election will be held. Parliaments can also be dissolved if two-thirds of the House of Commons votes for an early election.

The first change was during the reign of William and Mary, when it was seen to be inconvenient to have no Parliament at a time when succession to the Crown could be disputed, and an Act was passed that provided that a Parliament was to continue for six months after the death of a Sovereign, unless dissolved earlier. Under the Representation of the People Act 1867 Parliament can now continue for as long as it would otherwise have done in the event of the death of the Sovereign.

After each Parliament concludes, the Crown issues writs to hold a general election and elect new members of the House of Commons, though membership of the House of Lords does not change.

Legislative functions

Laws can be made by Acts of the United Kingdom Parliament. While Acts can apply to the whole of the United Kingdom including Scotland, due to the continuing separation of Scots law many Acts do not apply to Scotland and may be matched either by equivalent Acts that apply to Scotland alone or, since 1999, by legislation set by the Scottish Parliament relating to devolved matters.

This has led to a paradox known as the West Lothian question. The existence of a devolved Scottish Parliament means that while Westminster MPs from Scotland may vote directly on matters that affect English constituencies, they may not have much power over their laws affecting their own constituency. Since there is no devolved "English Parliament", the converse is not true. While any Act of the Scottish Parliament may be overturned, amended or ignored by Westminster, in practice this has yet to happen. Legislative Consent Motions enables the UK Parliament to vote on issues normally devolved to Scotland, Wales or Northern Ireland, as part of United Kingdom legislation.

Laws, in draft form known as bills, may be introduced by any member of either House. A bill introduced by a Minister is known as a "Government Bill"; one introduced by another member is called a "Private Member's Bill". A different way of categorising bills involves the subject. Most bills, involving the general public, are called "public bills". A bill that seeks to grant special rights to an individual or small group of individuals, or a body such as a local authority, is called a "Private Bill". A Public Bill which affects private rights (in the way a Private Bill would) is called a "Hybrid Bill", although those that draft bills take pains to avoid this.

Private Members' Bills make up the majority of bills, but are far less likely to be passed than government bills. There are three methods for an MP to introduce a Private Member's Bill. The Private Members' Ballot (once per Session) put names into a ballot, and those who win are given time to propose a bill. The Ten Minute Rule is another method, where MPs are granted ten minutes to outline the case for a new piece of legislation. Standing Order 57 is the third method, which allows a bill to be introduced without debate if a day's notice is given to the Table Office. Filibustering is a danger, as an opponent of a bill can waste much of the limited time allotted to it. Private Members' Bills have no chance of success if the current government opposes them, but they are used in moral issues: the bills to decriminalise homosexuality and abortion were Private Members' Bills, for example. Governments can sometimes attempt to use Private Members' Bills to pass things it would rather not be associated with. "Handout bills" are bills which a government hands to MPs who win Private Members' Ballots.

Each Bill goes through several stages in each House. The first stage, called the first reading, is a formality. At the second reading, the general principles of the bill are debated, and the House may vote to reject the bill, by not passing the motion "That the Bill be now read a second time." Defeats of Government Bills in the Commons are extremely rare, the last being in 2005, and may constitute a motion of no confidence. (Defeats of Bills in the Lords never affect confidence and are much more frequent.)

Following the second reading, the bill is sent to a committee. In the House of Lords, the Committee of the Whole House or the Grand Committee are used. Each consists of all members of the House; the latter operates under special procedures, and is used only for uncontroversial bills. In the House of Commons, the bill is usually committed to a Public Bill Committee, consisting of between 16 and 50 members, but the Committee of the Whole House is used for important legislation. Several other types of committees, including Select Committees, may be used, but rarely. A committee considers the bill clause by clause, and reports the bill as amended to the House, where further detailed consideration ("consideration stage" or "report stage") occurs. However, a practice which used to be called the "kangaroo" (Standing Order 32) allows the Speaker to select which amendments are debated. This device is also used under Standing Order 89 by the committee chairman, to restrict debate in committee. The Speaker, who is impartial as between the parties, by convention selects amendments for debate which represent the main divisions of opinion within the House. Other amendments can technically be proposed, but in practice have no chance of success unless the parties in the House are closely divided. If pressed they would normally be casually defeated by acclamation.

Once the House has considered the bill, the third reading follows. In the House of Commons, no further amendments may be made, and the passage of the motion "That the Bill be now read a third time" is passage of the whole bill. In the House of Lords further amendments to the bill may be moved. After the passage of the third reading motion, the House of Lords must vote on the motion "That the Bill do now pass." Following its passage in one House, the bill is sent to the other House. If passed in identical form by both Houses, it may be presented for the Sovereign's Assent. If one House passes amendments that the other will not agree to, and the two Houses cannot resolve their disagreements, the bill will normally fail.

Since the passage of the Parliament Act 1911 the power of the House of Lords to reject bills passed by the House of Commons has been restricted, with further restrictions were placed by the Parliament Act 1949. If the House of Commons passes a public bill in two successive sessions, and the House of Lords rejects it both times, the Commons may direct that the bill be presented to the Sovereign for his or her Assent, disregarding the rejection of the Bill in the House of Lords. In each case, the bill must be passed by the House of Commons at least one calendar month before the end of the session. The provision does not apply to Private bills or to Public bills if they originated in the House of Lords or if they seek to extend the duration of a Parliament beyond five years. A special procedure applies in relation to bills classified by the Speaker of the House of Commons as "Money Bills". A Money Bill concerns solely national taxation or public funds; the Speaker's certificate is deemed conclusive under all circumstances. If the House of Lords fails to pass a Money Bill within one month of its passage in the House of Commons, the Lower House may direct that the Bill be submitted for the Sovereign's Assent immediately.

Even before the passage of the Parliament Acts, the Commons possessed pre-eminence in cases of financial matters. By ancient custom, the House of Lords may not introduce a bill relating to taxation or Supply, nor amend a bill so as to insert a provision relating to taxation or Supply, nor amend a Supply Bill in any way. The House of Commons is free to waive this privilege, and sometimes does so to allow the House of Lords to pass amendments with financial implications. The House of Lords remains free to reject bills relating to Supply and taxation, but may be over-ruled easily if the bills are Money Bills. (A bill relating to revenue and Supply may not be a Money Bill if, for example, it includes subjects other than national taxation and public funds).

The last stage of a bill involves the granting of the Royal Assent. Theoretically, the Sovereign may either grant or withhold Royal Assent (make the bill a law or veto the bill). In modern times the Sovereign always grants the Royal Assent, using the Norman French words "Le Roy le veult" (the King wishes it; "La Reyne" in the case of a Queen). The last refusal to grant the Assent was in 1708, when Queen Anne withheld her Assent from a bill "for the settling of Militia in Scotland", in the words "" (the Queen will think it over).

Thus, every bill obtains the assent of all three components of Parliament before it becomes law (except where the House of Lords is over-ridden under the Parliament Acts 1911 and 1949). The words "BE IT ENACTED by the King's most Excellent Majesty, by and with the advice and consent of the Lords Spiritual and Temporal, and Commons, in this present Parliament assembled, and by the authority of the same, as follows:-," or, where the House of Lords' authority has been over-ridden by use of the Parliament Acts, the words "BE IT ENACTED by King's most Excellent Majesty, by and with the advice and consent of the Commons in this present Parliament assembled, in accordance with the provisions of the Parliament Acts 1911 and 1949, and by the authority of the same, as follows:-" appear near the beginning of each Act of Parliament. These words are known as the enacting formula.

Judicial functions

Prior to the creation of the Supreme Court of the United Kingdom in 2009, Parliament was the highest court in the realm for most purposes, but the Privy Council had jurisdiction in some cases (for instance, appeals from ecclesiastical courts). The jurisdiction of Parliament arose from the ancient custom of petitioning the Houses to redress grievances and to do justice. The House of Commons ceased considering petitions to reverse the judgements of lower courts in 1399, effectively leaving the House of Lords as the court of last resort. In modern times, the judicial functions of the House of Lords were performed not by the whole House, but by the Lords of Appeal in Ordinary (judges granted life peerage dignities under the Appellate Jurisdiction Act 1876) and by Lords of Appeal (other peers with experience in the judiciary). However, under the Constitutional Reform Act 2005, these judicial functions were transferred to the newly created Supreme Court in 2009, and the Lords of Appeal in Ordinary became the first Justices of the Supreme Court. Peers who hold high judicial office are no longer allowed to vote or speak in the Lords until they retire as justices.

In the late 19th century, Acts allowed for the appointment of Scottish Lords of Appeal in Ordinary and ended appeal in Scottish criminal matters to the House of Lords, so that the High Court of Justiciary became the highest criminal court in Scotland. There is an argument that the provisions of Article XIX of the Union with England Act 1707 prevent any Court outside Scotland from hearing any appeal in criminal cases: "And that the said Courts or any other of the like nature after the Unions shall have no power to Cognosce Review or Alter the Acts or Sentences of the Judicatures within Scotland or stop the Execution of the same." The House of Lords judicial committee usually had a minimum of two Scottish Judges to ensure that some experience of Scots law was brought to bear on Scottish appeals in civil cases, from the Court of Session. The Supreme Court now usually has at least two Scottish judges, together with at least one from Northern Ireland. As Wales is developing its own judicature, it is likely that the same principle will be applied.

Certain other judicial functions have historically been performed by the House of Lords. Until 1948, it was the body in which peers had to be tried for felonies or high treason; now, they are tried by normal juries. The last occasion of the trial of a peer in the House of Lords was in 1935. When the House of Commons impeaches an individual, the trial takes place in the House of Lords. Impeachments are now possibly defunct, as the last one occurred in 1806. In 2006, a number of MPs attempted to revive the custom, having signed a motion for the impeachment of Tony Blair, but this was unsuccessful.

Relationship with the UK Government
The British Government is answerable to the House of Commons. However, neither the Prime Minister nor members of the Government are elected by the House of Commons. Instead, the King requests the person most likely to command the support of a majority in the House, normally the leader of the largest party in the House of Commons, to form a government. So that they may be accountable to the Lower House, the Prime Minister and most members of the Cabinet are, by convention, members of the House of Commons. The last Prime Minister to be a member of the House of Lords was Alec Douglas-Home, 14th Earl of Home, who became Prime Minister in 1963. To adhere to the convention under which he was responsible to the Lower House, he disclaimed his peerage and procured election to the House of Commons within days of becoming Prime Minister.

Governments have a tendency to dominate the legislative functions of Parliament, by using their in-built majority in the House of Commons, and sometimes using their patronage power to appoint supportive peers in the Lords. In practice, governments can pass any legislation (within reason) in the Commons they wish, unless there is major dissent by MPs in the governing party.
But even in these situations, it is highly unlikely a bill will be defeated, though dissenting MPs may be able to extract concessions from the government. In 1976, Quintin Hogg, Lord Hailsham of St Marylebone created a now widely used name for this behaviour, in an academic paper called "elective dictatorship".

Parliament controls the executive by passing or rejecting its Bills and by forcing Ministers of the Crown to answer for their actions, either at "Question Time" or during meetings of the parliamentary committees. In both cases, Ministers are asked questions by members of their Houses, and are obliged to answer.

Although the House of Lords may scrutinise the executive through Question Time and through its committees, it cannot bring down the Government. A ministry must always retain the confidence and support of the House of Commons. The Lower House may indicate its lack of support by rejecting a Motion of Confidence or by passing a Motion of No Confidence. Confidence Motions are generally originated by the Government to reinforce its support in the House, whilst No Confidence Motions are introduced by the Opposition. The motions sometimes take the form "That this House has [no] confidence in His Majesty's Government" but several other varieties, many referring to specific policies supported or opposed by Parliament, are used. For instance, a Confidence Motion of 1992 used the form, "That this House expresses the support for the economic policy of His Majesty's Government." Such a motion may theoretically be introduced in the House of Lords, but, as the Government need not enjoy the confidence of that House, would not be of the same effect as a similar motion in the House of Commons; the only modern instance of such an occurrence involves the 'No Confidence' motion that was introduced in 1993 and subsequently defeated.

Many votes are considered votes of confidence, although not including the language mentioned above. Important bills that form part of the Government's agenda (as stated in the Speech from the Throne) are generally considered matters of confidence. The defeat of such a bill by the House of Commons indicates that a Government no longer has the confidence of that House. The same effect is achieved if the House of Commons "withdraws Supply," that is, rejects the budget.

Where a Government has lost the confidence of the House of Commons, in other words has lost the ability to secure the basic requirement of the authority of the House of Commons to tax and to spend Government money, the Prime Minister is obliged either to resign, or seek the dissolution of Parliament and a new general election. Otherwise the machinery of government grinds to a halt within days. The third choice – to mount a coup d'état or an anti-democratic revolution – is hardly to be contemplated in the present age. Though all three situations have arisen in recent years even in developed economies, international relations have allowed a disaster to be avoided.

Where a Prime Minister has ceased to retain the necessary majority and requests a dissolution, the Sovereign can in theory reject his or her request, forcing a resignation and allowing the Leader of the Opposition to be asked to form a new government. This power is used extremely rarely. The conditions that should be met to allow such a refusal are known as the Lascelles Principles. These conditions and principles are constitutional conventions arising from the Sovereign's reserve powers as well as longstanding tradition and practice, not laid down in law.

In practice, the House of Commons' scrutiny of the Government is very weak. Since the first-past-the-post electoral system is employed in elections, the governing party tends to enjoy a large majority in the Commons; there is often limited need to compromise with other parties. Modern British political parties are so tightly organised that they leave relatively little room for free action by their MPs. In many cases, MPs may be expelled from their parties for voting against the instructions of party leaders. During the 20th century, the Government has lost confidence issues only three times—twice in 1924, and once in 1979.

Parliamentary questions

In the United Kingdom, question time in the House of Commons lasts for an hour each day from Monday to Thursday (2:30 to 3:30 pm on Mondays, 11:30 am to 12:30 pm on Tuesdays and Wednesdays, and 9:30 to 10:30 am on Thursdays). Each Government department has its place in a rota which repeats every five weeks. The exception to this sequence are the Business Questions (Questions to the Leader of House of Commons), in which questions are answered each Thursday about the business of the House the following week. Also, Questions to the Prime Minister takes place each Wednesday from noon to 12:30 pm.

In addition to government departments, there are also questions to the Church commissioners. Additionally, each Member of Parliament is entitled to table questions for written answer. Written questions are addressed to the Ministerial head of a government department, usually a Secretary of State, but they are often answered by a Minister of State or Parliamentary Under Secretary of State. Written Questions are submitted to the Clerks of the Table Office, either on paper or electronically, and answers are recorded in The Official Report (Hansard) so as to be widely available and accessible.

In the House of Lords, a half-hour is set aside each afternoon at the start of the day's proceedings for Lords' oral questions. A peer submits a question in advance, which then appears on the Order Paper for the day's proceedings. The peer shall say: "My Lords, I beg leave to ask the Question standing in my name on the Order Paper." The Minister responsible then answers the question. The peer is then allowed to ask a supplementary question and other peers ask further questions on the theme of the original put down on the order paper. (For instance, if the question regards immigration, peers can ask the Minister any question related to immigration during the allowed period.)

Parliamentary sovereignty

Several different views have been taken of Parliament's sovereignty. According to the jurist Sir William Blackstone, "It has sovereign and uncontrollable authority in making, confirming, enlarging, restraining, abrogating, repealing, reviving, and expounding of laws, concerning matters of all possible denominations, ecclesiastical, or temporal, civil, military, maritime, or criminal… it can, in short, do every thing that is not naturally impossible."

A different view has been taken by the Scottish judge Thomas Cooper, 1st Lord Cooper of Culross. When he decided the 1953 case of MacCormick v. Lord Advocate as Lord President of the Court of Session, he stated, "The principle of unlimited sovereignty of Parliament is a distinctively English principle and has no counterpart in Scottish constitutional law." He continued, "Considering that the Union legislation extinguished the Parliaments of Scotland and England and replaced them by a new Parliament, I have difficulty in seeing why the new Parliament of Great Britain must inherit all the peculiar characteristics of the English Parliament but none of the Scottish." Nevertheless, he did not give a conclusive opinion on the subject.

Thus, the question of Parliamentary sovereignty appears to remain unresolved. Parliament has not passed any Act defining its own sovereignty. The European Union (Withdrawal Agreement) Act 2020 states "It is recognised that the Parliament of the United Kingdom is sovereign." without qualification or definition. A related possible limitation on Parliament relates to the Scottish legal system and Presbyterian faith, preservation of which were Scottish preconditions to the creation of the unified Parliament. Since the Parliament of the United Kingdom was set up in reliance on these promises, it may be that it has no power to make laws that break them.

Parliament's power has often been limited by its own Acts, whilst retaining the power to overturn those decisions should it decide to

Acts passed in 1921 and 1925 granted the Church of Scotland complete independence in ecclesiastical matters. From 1973 to 2020, under membership of the European Community and European Union, parliament agreed to the position that European law would apply and be enforceable in Britain and that Britain would be subject to the rulings of the European Court of Justice. In the Factortame case, the European Court of Justice ruled that British courts could have powers to overturn British legislation that was not compatible with European law.  This position ended with the passing of the European Union (Withdrawal Agreement) Act 2020 and Britain leaving the EU on 31 January 2020.

Parliament has also created national devolved parliaments and an assembly with differing degrees of legislative authority in Scotland, Wales and Northern Ireland, but not in England, which continues to be governed by the Parliament of the United Kingdom. Parliament still has the power over areas for which responsibility lies with the devolved institutions, but would ordinarily gain the agreement of those institutions to act on their behalf. Similarly, it has granted the power to make regulations to Ministers of the Crown, and the power to enact religious legislation to the General Synod of the Church of England. (Measures of the General Synod and, in some cases proposed statutory instruments made by ministers, must be approved by both Houses before they become law.)

In every case aforementioned, authority has been conceded by Act of Parliament and may be taken back in the same manner. It is entirely within the authority of Parliament, for example, to abolish the devolved governments in Scotland, Wales and Northern Ireland, or — as happened in 2020 — to leave the EU. However, Parliament also revoked its legislative competence over Australia and Canada with the Australia and Canada Acts: although the Parliament of the United Kingdom could pass an Act reversing its action, it would not take effect in Australia or Canada as the competence of the Imperial Parliament is no longer recognised there in law.

One well-recognised consequence of Parliament's sovereignty is that it cannot bind future Parliaments; that is, no Act of Parliament may be made secure from amendment or repeal by a future Parliament. For example, although the Act of Union 1800 states that the Kingdoms of Great Britain and Ireland are to be united "forever," Parliament permitted southern Ireland to leave the United Kingdom in 1922.

Privileges

Each House of Parliament possesses and guards various ancient privileges. The House of Lords relies on inherent right. In the case of the House of Commons, the Speaker goes to the Lords' Chamber at the beginning of each new Parliament and requests representatives of the Sovereign to confirm the Lower House's "undoubted" privileges and rights. The ceremony observed by the House of Commons dates to the reign of King Henry VIII. Each House is the guardian of its privileges, and may punish breaches thereof. The extent of parliamentary privilege is based on law and custom. Sir William Blackstone states that these privileges are "very large and indefinite," and cannot be defined except by the Houses of Parliament themselves.

The foremost privilege claimed by both Houses is that of freedom of speech in debate; nothing said in either House may be questioned in any court or other institution outside Parliament. Another privilege claimed is that of freedom from arrest; at one time this was held to apply for any arrest except for high treason, felony or breach of the peace but it now excludes any arrest on criminal charges; it applies during a session of Parliament, and 40 days before or after such a session. Members of both Houses are no longer privileged from service on juries.

Both Houses possess the power to punish breaches of their privilege. Contempt of Parliament—for example, disobedience of a subpoena issued by a committee—may also be punished. The House of Lords may imprison an individual for any fixed period of time, but an individual imprisoned by the House of Commons is set free upon prorogation. The punishments imposed by either House may not be challenged in any court, and the Human Rights Act does not apply.

Until at least 2015, members of the House of Commons also had the privilege of a separate seating area in the Palace of Westminster canteen, protected by a false partition labelled "MPs only beyond this point," so that they did not have to sit with canteen staff taking a break. This provoked mockery from a newly elected 20-year-old MP who described it as "ridiculous" snobbery.

Emblem

The quasi-official emblem of the Houses of Parliament is a crowned portcullis. The portcullis was originally the badge of various English noble families from the 14th century. It went on to be adopted by the kings of the Tudor dynasty in the 16th century, under whom the Palace of Westminster became the regular meeting place of Parliament. The crown was added to make the badge a specifically royal symbol.

The portcullis probably first came to be associated with the Palace of Westminster through its use as decoration in the rebuilding of the Palace after the fire of 1512. However, at the time it was only one of many symbols. The widespread use of the portcullis throughout the Palace dates from the 19th century, when Charles Barry and Augustus Pugin used it extensively as a decorative feature in their designs for the new Palace built following the disastrous 1834 fire.

The crowned portcullis came to be accepted during the 20th century as the emblem of both houses of parliament. This was simply a result of custom and usage rather than a specific decision. The emblem now appears on official stationery, publications and papers, and is stamped on various items in use in the Palace of Westminster, such as cutlery, silverware and china. Various shades of red and green are used for visual identification of the House of Lords and the House of Commons.

Broadcast media
All public events are broadcast live and on-demand via www.parliamentlive.tv, which maintains an archive dating back to 4 December 2007. There is also a related official YouTube channel. They are also broadcast live by the independent Euronews English channel. In the UK the BBC has its own dedicated parliament channel, BBC Parliament, which broadcasts 24 hours a day and is also available on BBC iPlayer. It shows live coverage from the House of Commons, House of Lords, the Scottish Parliament, the Northern Ireland Assembly and the Senedd.

See also

 Act of Parliament
 Acts of Parliament of the United Kingdom relating to the European Communities and the European Union
 History of democracy
 The History of Parliament
 List of Acts of the Parliament of the United Kingdom
 List of British governments
 List of parliaments of the United Kingdom
 Parliament in the Making, a programme of anniversary events in 2015
 Parliament of the United Kingdom relocation
 Parliamentary agent
 Parliamentary Brief
 Parliamentary Information and Communication Technology Service
 Parliamentary Office of Science and Technology
 Parliamentary records of the United Kingdom
 Records of members of parliament of the United Kingdom
 TheyWorkForYou
 United Kingdom Parliament constituencies
 UK Parliament Week

Lists of MPs elected

 List of MPs elected in the 1966 United Kingdom general election
 List of MPs elected in the 1970 United Kingdom general election
 List of MPs elected in the February 1974 United Kingdom general election
 List of MPs elected in the October 1974 United Kingdom general election
 List of MPs elected in the 1979 United Kingdom general election
 List of MPs elected in the 1983 United Kingdom general election
 List of MPs elected in the 1987 United Kingdom general election
 List of MPs elected in the 1992 United Kingdom general election
 List of MPs elected in the 1997 United Kingdom general election
 List of MPs elected in the 2001 United Kingdom general election
 List of MPs elected in the 2005 United Kingdom general election
 List of MPs elected in the 2010 United Kingdom general election
 List of MPs elected in the 2015 United Kingdom general election
 List of MPs elected in the 2017 United Kingdom general election
 List of MPs elected in the 2019 United Kingdom general election

Notes

References

Footnotes

Sources

External links

 
 Public Policy Hub – Parliament and law making
 Hansard from 1803 to 2005
 Parliament Live TV
 "A–Z of Parliament"—The British Broadcasting Corporation (2005).
 Topic: Politics—The Guardian
 Topic: House of Lords—The Guardian
 Parliamentary procedure site at Leeds University
 British House of Commons people (C-SPAN)
 
 

 
1801 establishments in the United Kingdom
United Kingdom
United Kingdom
United Kingdom
Politics of the United Kingdom
United Kingdom